Olea tsoongii is a plant of the genus Olea, found in Guangdong, Guangxi, Guizhou, Hainan, Sichuan, and Yunnan provinces of China. It grows as shrubs or trees 3–15 meters in height, with its seed oil used in food and industry.

Synonyms
 Ligustrum tsoongii Merrill, Philipp. J. Sci. 21: 506. 1922
 Olea brevipes L. C. Chia
 Olea yuennanensis Handel-Mazzetti
 Olea yuennanensis var. xeromorpha Handel-Mazzetti.

References

External links

tsoongii